Music composition and composers in Pristina refers to music composition and composers who have left their mark in Pristina. The importance of Kosovan Folklore on the different genres, their development and their popularity. As referring to genres as a categorization would not cover all compositions and composers in a fair way, a highlight of every composers work and different genres is provided because of the different genres a composers work has included throughout the years.

History of composition genre development in Pristina

Folklore

Kosovan Music is considered to be very rich in genres and their development. But before talking about genre development, a key point that has to be mentioned is without doubt the rich Folklore of Kosovo most of which unfortunately has not been digitalized and/or saved in archives. The importance of folklore is reflected in two main keys, it is considered a "treasure" of cultural heritage of our country and it helps to enlighten the Albanian and Kosovan history of that time, and the importance of that is of a high level especially when mentioning the circumstances of our territory in that time. 
Folklor has also served as inspiration and influence in many fields including music composition in the next generations  
One of the most notable and very first composers: Rexho Mulliqi in whose work, folklore inspiration and influence is very present.

Professional (artistic) music
When highlighting the music creativity and its starts in Kosovo and the relation between it and the music creativity in Albania even though they have had their
development in different circumstances, it is proved that they share some characteristics in a very natural way. This fact shows that they belong to one "Cultural Tree".
Professional music (referred to as artistic music) in Kosovo dates back to the late 1940s.
An important historical even is the finding of the ancient instrument: "Okarina Autentike" (The authentic okarina).
More visible traces of Professional Music in Kosovo can be found in the post-war period when the first radio station in Prizren was opened in 1945 and it was later moved to Pristina.
This was followed by the opening of the Arts Academy, the first recordings, other recordings made for the specific programs of that time.
Another important move was made when the Orchestra of the same Radio was founded, a move which opened doors to the organization of further events and festivals which gradually became a tradition.
The production of Radio Pristina also served as a gathering of the only professional ensembles of that time which were:
The Folks Music Orchestra
The Pop Music Orchestra
The Symphony Orchestra (found in the 1950s)
The Professional Choir (found in 1980)
The Children's Choir
Another thing of higher importance were the "three associations" which also served as gathering for musicians.
The Association of Composers which had 30 members; which were composers of different genres and a number of authors.
The Association of Musicians and Artists which had 20 members; including productive artists, instrumentalists, kapellmeisters, and singers.
The Association of Music Professors which had a wider range of members.
The most important Association was the one of Composers which besides the gatherings of musicians and artists, organized a number of other music related activities.
This association was the founder of the festival "Ditet e Muzikes Kosovare" (The Days of Kosovan Music) which was organized from 1979 to 1992.
The Music Activities an interruption from 1990 to 1999 due to political circumstances. The activity of Kosovan composers had its development in and outside Kosovo.
Even though small in numbers of composers the creativity level was on a high level.

Classical music
Classical music in Kosovo dates back to the 1970s and is of a very solid level when talking works and composers. A detailed article about Classical Music in Kosovo which contains a brief history, major composers of classical music and their work etc.

Rock music
Blue Stars is the first Kosovan rock band founded in 1964 in Pristina and the first band members of this band were :
Agim Berisha, Fahri Bejta, Afrim Luboteni, Tomor Berisha and Veton & Luan Berisha. In 1973 this band was renamed to Modestët
The band Minatori was founded in the 70s, and to this date it has published eight albums and has performed in 1600 concerts/gigs. It is said that with Mintaori Rock Music started to sound Shqip than being based on the vocabulary, articulation and the expression which were also key factors on making this band one of the most influential rock bands even in the later generations. After this other bands were formed such as 403, Ilirët, Gjurmët etc.

Children's music
Xixëllonjat (1992-) is a vocal group which is still active in Kosovo, around 700 members have been a part of this vocal group which have participated in over 350 festivals and concerts. They also have their own festival and their own studio.

Composition field in the University of Prisitna

The beginnings of the Faculty of Arts are, in the Department of the Figurative arts which was founded on 31 July 1973. The Academy started working on 25 December 1973.
The Music Arts Department was founded in 1975 and The Dramatic arts was founded in 1989. In 1986 the Academy changed into the Faculty of Arts with the name "Faculty of Arts in Pristina".

The Faculty of Arts in the University of Pristina has three Departments which are:
The Department of Figurative(Visual) Arts
The Department of Music Arts
The Department of Dramatic Arts

"Composition" as a studying field is a part of the "Department of Music Arts" which in total has these fields:
Conduction
Music Pedagogy
Brass Instruments
Vocal Pedagogy
String Instruments
Percussion Instruments
Musicology and Ethnomusicology

As up today in the Faculty of Arts have graduated over 900 students.
The Department of Music Arts has now the Master Programs in:
Instruments
Composing and conducting
Theory of Music and
General Music Pedagogy

Composers in Pristina

Akil Koci
Akil Koci (born 1936) was born in Prizren, where he also finished music high school, after which he went to study in the Music Theory department at the Music Academy in Sarajevo. He went on to study composition in Skopje and Germany. In Pristina he was the leader of the music tracks field of the Radio and TV of Pristina and the Dean of the Music Faculty in Pristina. 
His work was considered outstanding, and innovative to the point where it was considered avant-garde and more like 2000s music style(s). One important characteristic of his work, which was new for Albanian music, was his use of Aleatoricism.

Work

More Detailed information about Akil Koci can be found on this Wikipedia Article and a list of prizes and awards received by Akil Koci can be found on this Wikipedia Article.

Andin Randobrava
Andin Randobrava is a composer and he is also the son of the composer Reshat Randobrava, a fact that justifies his young start in the music business. He started creating at a very young age and quickly became a successful composers in Pristina.
He was born in 1979, in Pristina where he finished primary and highschool. He has collaborated with a number of artists and has participated in a number of festivals
He is also the owner of "Radobrava Records" a very popular studio for different genres and artists.

He has participated in various festivals as a composer and arranger such as Show Fest

Artist collaborations

Bahri Mulliqi
Bahri Mulliqi (born 1959) is a composer who studied composition in the Music Faculty of Pristina in 1989

He was born in Pristina where he also finished music high school. From 1994 to 1996, he was assistant dean at the same faculty and a member of the Faculty INstranded regulatory organ. Bahri Mulliqis creative works are rather characterized by differences and have been presented in most capitals in Socialist Federal Republic of Yugoslavia and Albania. He now lives and works in America. His artistic activities include:
Choir songs
Songs for piano
Chamber Music
Instrumental and vocal works for orchestra, soloists and chorus.

Baki Jashari
Baki Jashari (born 1960) is a teacher and composer who finished studies in the Music Academy in Ljubljana

He was born in Pristina where he finished music high school. Besides composition he has also studied musicology at the University of Ljubljana. He started Master's studies in 1984 in Graz. From 2000 he worked as a teacher Music Faculty In Pristina and as a music editor at Radio and Television of Kosovo. During his studies and stay in Slovenia Baki Jashari had great success with the women's choir "Unity, where in 1982, he was in the choir competition in Maribor  " Gold Plaque " .
Baki Jashari has also conducted the choir " Glazbena Matica " from Ljubljana. With the " Glzbena Matica" Choir he had a lot of successes in Slovenia. With the Music School String Quartet from Ljubljana he has had several concerts both in Slovenia and in a number of European countries and a few American ones such as:
Austria
Hungary
Italy
Spain
United States (Chicago and Cleveland)
He has also conducted the Kosovo Philharmonic Hall orchestra and participated in several festivals and competitions both in Kosovo and outside. Baki Jashari has directed the women's choir " Ars Vocalis " from Pristina and has had numerous concerts.

Work as a composer

Bashkim Shehu
Bashkim Shehu (born 1952) is a composer who has studied composition at the Music Academy of Sarajevo. He specialized in the class of Betsy Joles and Toni Aubin in France.

He was born in Peja and finished music high school in Pristina, where he worked as a teacher at the Music Academy after finishing his studies in composition. His tonal language belongs to the new age of music creations. He went to follow Rafet Rudi's path, but unlike him, he also writes film music and ballet music. Today he lives in Croatia.
His works have been performed in:
Kosovo 
Albania
Russia 
America

Work as composer

Efraim Kastrati
Efraim Kastrati (born 1952) is a singer and composer, he finished studies in the Academy of Arts in the University of Pristina in the Music Arts Department. He was born in Peja, and finished primary school and high school there. During his high school studies he started a band with Luan Sapunxhiu (guitarist) and Bedri islami (singer) called "Meridianet".
A band which used to play songs of major artists of that time such as "The Beatles", "Elvis Presley", "Led Zeppelin" etc.
He moved to Pristina in 1975. During his studies in the Academy of Arts he started preparing for Piano, Singing and Music Theory. In that period if time he was also a singer and drummer.
He was also accepted as a singer in the audition for the "Revial Orchestra" of RTP which was followed by his work there in different fields such as arrangement, singing and instrumentalist.

He opened a studio in which also serves as a vocal/guitar/piano class taking course.
Genres : Even though the main genre of his work is Pop/Rock During his work as a composer he experimented in different genres from Children's Music to Vocal-Instrumental pieces.

Composition for film and theatre

and among the Film works the most notable were "Hijet e Luftes" and "Zogjte e Luftes" both directed by Adem Mikullovci and shown in RTK.

Collaborations

Esat Rizvanolli
Esat Rizvanolli (1936–2006) was one of the most influential Kosovan composers.
He was born in Gjakova. He studied in Prizren in music high school and after that he continued the Academy of Music in Belgrade and he finished he's graduation at the Conservatory PIT Jajkovski in Moscow. Rizvanolli was employed in Radio Pristina as music editor and also he gave lessons of music on Universiteti i Prishtines. The characteristic of his musical expression is integration of different motives from the folk music which is considered a very rare characteristic.

Work

More information about Esat Rizvanolli and his compositions can be found on this Wikipedia Article

Florent Boshnjaku
Florent Boshnjaku (born 1970) is one of the most successful composers and he is especially known for his participation as a composer in the Eurovision Song Contest 2012, where the song Suus sung by Rona Nishliu reached the 5th position, the highest rank in the history of Albanian participations in the contest. The song was also considered one of the best Albanian songs.
He was born in Gjakova but he finished primary school and music high school in Pristina where he lives to this day. He went on to study Sound Engineering in New York and Sound Production in London in 1996 in "Westminster school of performing arts". He was also a member of the band "Oda", one of the most successful bands in Kosovo. He has worked as a composer for a large number of artists and won a lot of awards as a composer.

Some of his Participations and Awards are:

Gjon Gjevelekaj
Gjon Gjevelekaj (born 1951) is a composer who studied composition in Sarajevo.

He was born in Prizren. After finishing his studies in Sarajevo he specialized in Paris. After graduation, he worked for Radio Pristina as music editor for a longer period of time.

Work

Halit Kasapolli
Halit Kasapolli (1937–1959) remains one of the most important contributors in the artistic music development even though he died at a very young age (22 years old), news which shocked the art scene and that is because his creativity and work was considered a necessity for Kosovo. Halit Kasapolli was born in Peja and finished music high school in Prizren. He started studies at the Belgrade Music Academy but didn't finish because of his sudden death.

Ilir Bajri
Ilir Bajri (born 1969) is a composer and pianist, he finished studies at Academy of Arts in the University of Pristina in the Music Arts Department for General Music Education. He is mostly known for his Jazz compositions but he has also experimented with different genres such as Pop, Classical and Contemporary Classical Music.
He was born in Peja and than moved to Pristina before starting studies in the field mentioned above. Besides his work as a composer, he is also known for his visual work and his performances that introduce his new works specifically in "postmodern" music style.

Work as a composer

Another article about Ilir Bajri can be found here (in Albanian).

Ilir Tolaj
Ilir Tolaj (born 1978) is a composer even though he finished the Faculty for International Relations and Diplomacy.
He was born in Mitrovica where he finished primary school and music high school. He is known for being the leader and composer of the well known pop/rock band "Margiona". Tjere is a large number of artists who he collaborated with as a composer:

Another important project was "Ethnically Plugged" which played re-arranged old shqip songs and it was very successful and high praised
Ethnically plugged's music was used for the movie "Heroi", a very successful movie who premiered in early 2014.

Kristë Lekaj
Kristë Lekaj (born 1935) was an active composer even though he studied for the Theory and Education department in the Music Academy of Belgrade.
He was born in Skopje. Despite his field studies for another department Kristë Lekaj has been a notable composer and music creator in genuine. His vocal works consist of high quality and results and so has resulted his work in folk pieces.

Kristë Lekaj worked in several fields and positions at Radio Pristina such as music editor, arranger and kapellmeister for the entertainment orchestra of Radio Pristina.

Lorenc Antoni

Lorenc Antoni (1909–1992) was the first Composer, music teacher and pioneer in the artistic music creation in Kosovo.
Han was born in Skopje where he finish his secondary education in Skopje where he also took private lessons in music marking so his first steps for further development in music. After finishing studies in Belgrade(1941), he lived and worked in various cities of Kosovo including Pristina.
In 1948 he opened the first music school in Prizren, where he became the first rector. 
He moved to Pristina in 1956, where he worked as a music editor at Radio Pristina in the Folk Music Department until his death .
He has collected over 800 Folk songs and melodies from different parts of Kosovo, Montenegro and Macedonia. Most of which were included in his collection, consisting of 7- collection of books with the above folk songs and melodies.
Lorenc Antoni has processed and composed many vocal and instrumental works for choir, orchestra and soloists.

Work

Even More Detailed information about Lorenc Antoni and his work can be found Here

Mark Kaçinari
Mark Kacinari (1935–1983) is a composer who studied at the Music Academy in Belgrade in the Theory and Education department and composition at the Music Academy in Skopje.
He was born in Prizren, where he finished music high school, and worked as a teacher after finishing his studies in Belgrade. Another huge success in Prizren, this time with the cultural association was his work as a choir director and Kapellmeister. He also taught at the Music Faculty In Pristina. But his success with choirs passed the "borders" of Prizren, further more the "Collegium Vanotrium" choir in Pristina became known over the entire Balkans.

Work

Mendi Mengjiqi

Mendi Mengjiqi (born 1958) is a composer. He graduated in the Music Academy in Pristina in 1987 in the Music Theory Department
He was born in the village Lubc In ulet - Kosova and finished music high school in Pristina.
He studied composition at the same faculty and must interrupt 1990.
After leaving Kosovo, he continued his studies at the Academy of Music in Kraków Polen, where took a master's degree in 1996 at the composer K.Penderecki
At the beginning of Mendi Mengjiqi's career, he composed children's songs and folk songs. Under that time, he made several orchestra arrangements which were interpreted in and outside Kosovo. His studies in Kraków and contacts with Polish composers have affected his development. With his new style, he has composed a number of works. Med In his new style, he has composed a number of works, and participated in several music festivals. His music work is quite different, both vocal and instrumental. Over his career he has been in Europe, Mexico, South Korea and The United States.
In connection with Kraków's 600-year jubileeum, he composed vocal and instrumental works, dedicated to Mother Therese, who had great success.
Today he teaches composition at the Music Faculty in Pristina.
Wone of his biggest successes as a composer is for Choir and it's titled "OEIA"

Work presented in festivals

Another article with additional information can be found Here

Musa Piperku
Musa Piperku (1945–2005) was a composer who studied further at the Music Academy in Belgrade in the Department of Theory and Education of Music

Musa Piperku was born in Diber and went to music school in Prizren. In the beginning, he worked in his native town but later moved to Skopje to become a music editor at Radio Skopje. After that he settled in Kosovo and began working as a redactor at Radio Pristina.
He has composed several children's songs, songs folk spirit and even some popular music .I his style of music, he is very extensive and many of his songs are popular even today.
During his career as a composer, he received many awards and honors for his composition/
HE lived the last years of his life and worked in Prishtina, Republic of Kosova .
He died suddenly in 2005.
There were a number of homages and requiems after his death; honoring his outstanding work and contribution.

Nexhat Macula
Nexhat Macula (born 1955) is a Kosovan guitar player and composer even though he studited English Language and Literature in Belgrade.
He was born in Mitrovica where he finished music highschool. In 1970 founded the band "FAN", which was a band that played international songs, and was considered
to be one of the first bands especially in the time where rock music had its peak. 
He is also known for founding and composing albums for the band "TNT" in 1976 who recorded their first album in 1980 in the studios of RTP.
The band TNT has currently a new vocalist and is still very active in the music scene

Rafet Rudi
composer and conductor who was born in Mitrovica (Kosova) in 1949. He graduated Music Academy in Belgrade, with major in Conducting and Composition. Later he completed his postgraduate studies in Sarajevo, followed by a one-year specialization in the National Conservatory of Paris, in the class of
the composer Claude Ballif in 1979/80. He worked as a conductor of the Prishtina Radio Television Professional Choir from 1980 to 1987. He is also a publisher and has more than 300 writings, such as essays, recensions, critics, etc. Rudi is also known as a writer in the field of music esthetics, and author of the recent book "Sprova estetike" (Esthetic challenges). He is also an author of numerous music textbooks. Rudi is the chair of the "Kosovar Center for New Music" and founder of Prishtina International Festival "ReMusica."

Currently, he is a professor of Musical Form and Composing in the Academy of Music in Prishtina and conductor of Kosova Philharmonic Choir.
Rudi has won many prizes and acknowledgements, as are: Kosovo's December Award for creations; International Festival BEMUS Award; Yearly ‘SHKK’ Award in 1982; etc. The following are some of his most important works: Symphony, Concert for guitar and string
orchestra, Concerto time for piano and simfonic orchestra, String quartet, The return for mezzo-soprano and simfonic orchestra, Afresk arbëresh III for vocal soloist, choir, 2 pianos, organo and tape, Dialogues perdu for flute, string trio and tape etc. 
His compositions were performed in France, Switzerland, United Kingdom, Italy, USA, Japan, Netherlands, Russia, Albania, Rumania, Spain, Sweden, Bulgaria, Croatia, Slovenia, etc. 

Since 2014, Rudi is member of European Academy of Science and Arts.

Work

Rauf Dhomi
Rauf Dhomi (born 1945) is a composer who studied at the Music Academy in Sarajevo where he took the exam in composition
He was born in Gjakova and finished music high school in Prizren.
Despite being more successful in composition his work as a kapellmeister marks another great success and high level, where among the most notable work was his direction and development of the male choir in Gjakova to a high art treatment level. As a composer he was very productive, and has composed several works, where we meet almost all forms of music from the Kosovan traditional music
and many other music forms such as ballet music, chamber music, orchestral music.
Rauf Dhomi is the composer of the first Kosovo -Albanian opera " Goca e Kaqanikut : by Milton Sotir Gurres(novel) which shows Albanians' struggle for freedom from the Ottoman Kingdom.

Work

Reshat Randobrava
Reshat Randobrava (born 1939) (also found as Reshad Randobrava)  is a composer who studied in the Music Pedagogy Department in the Music Academy of Sarajevo.
Reshat Randobrava was born in Prizren where he finished music high school. After his studies, he worked as a music teacher and then started working at the Radio and Television of Pristina as music editor and music producer. He has been the organizer of several music festivals, concerts and cultural events during his career. He also received numerous awards and prizes in Kosovo and beyond. He has composed several children's songs, folk songs, pop songs and melodies popular music.
Reshat Randobrava has published two; albums and several singles. His musical work is collected across in multiple CDs, music albums and books. His collections and editions have been financed by Kosovo's Ministry of Culture. As of today he lives and works in Pristina.

Work
Published Work in the "Kenge Zbavitese" (Pop Songs) book

Reshad Randobrava has 6 published CDs which are

Kompozime te Reshat Randobraves me tekste te poezive te Dritero Agollit (Compositions of Reshat Randobrava with lyrics by Dritero Agollis poems)

"Jete dhe Kenge" Kenget me te suksesshme - verzioni isntrumental ("Life and Songs" - Instrumental versions of Successful songs)

"Tungjatjeta" - Dedicated to his hometown Prizren (Hello)

"Kompozimet e Reshat Randobraves me tekste te poetit Adreni" (Compositions of Reshat Randobrava with lyrics by Asdreni's poems)

"Bregu Enderrtar" - Kompozimet e Reshat Randobraves me tekste te poeteve Kosovare ("The Dreaming Hill" - Compositions of Reshat Randobrava with lyrics of Kosovan poets)

"Jeta e Re" - Kompakt-disku i Reshat Randobraves per femije ("New Life" - Reshat Randobravad CD for children)

Rexho Mulliqi
Rexho Mulliqi (1923–1982) was the composer who was part of the first post-war generation. He was also the first academically trained composer in Kosovo.
He was born in Gusinje, but he lived and worked in Kosovo.
Before studying composition at the Music Academy in Belgrade he studied in Skopje, Macedonia and Pristina, Kosovo
One of the cities where Rexho Mulliqi was very active was Prizreni. To name a few of his activities Rexho Mulliqi was a teacher and choir director in Prizreni. But his activities in Pristina were of equal impact, one of which was working as a reporter for Radio Pristina until 1981. He was much influenced by the Traditional Folk Music Kosovo. His instrumental music creation is also very notable .
He was married to Nexhmie Pagarusha for whom he composed several songs, out of which best known is Baresha.

Work

Riza Dolaku
Riza Dolaku (born 1949) is a composer and the arranger who studied in the Music Academy of Belgrade.
He was born in Mitrovica and he started music high school in Prizren and finished it in Pristina.
After that he got acapted in the audition of RTP where he worked until the 90s all the employers were violently dissmised
He participated in various festivals such as:
"Akordet e Kosoves" - more as an arranger but also had a number of appearances as a composer
"zambaku i Prizrenit, Nota Fest etc. He was also a pianist and part of the judging panel in the festival "Shon Fest 2000"
He was also cited for his arrangement of the song "E dehun Jam" by Nexhmie Pagarusha, which was performed by Alma Bektashi in an honoring event for Nexhmie Pagarusha, organized by RTK

Sami Piraj
""Sami Piraj""(b. 1956) is a composer who studied at the Music Academy in the artistic instruction field.
He was born in 1956 in the village Pozharan - southeast of Kosovo and finished music high school in Pristina. He graduated in 1980 and spent a year music teacher. Sami Piraj, was the initiator of the music school in Gjilan in 1982. After moving to Pristina he started working as a journalist at the former newspaper Rilindja to monitor and inform about the cultural life in Kosovo .
Because the newspaper Rilindja not issued anymore began Sami Piraj now writes for the newspaper Bota Sot issued in Kosovo and several other European countries .
Sami pirajs journalistic orientation is associated with the monitoring of important music events and discursive problems within music world. He actively monitors developments and events, concerning possible abuse of music arts. He has written many articles comments and reviews for daily music plagiarism and other injustices in Kosovo music.
Sami Piraj has always written that music must be exercised properly and clean.
In addition, Sami Piraj was also active in composing. He has composed many ( 200 folk songs and songs in the popular music genre. These compositions have participated in numerous festivals. Here we can mention "Akordet e Kosoves" second and third prize, "Zambaku i Prizrenit" first prize. He has participated and gained several prizes on and the following festivals.
Kosovarja kendon
Nota Fest in Skopje
Poli Fest 
Children's Festival In Shkodra 
Albania and festival In Ulcinj 2005 ( Ulqini 2005) - Montenegro.
Many of his songs have been recorded on tape and CD.
Sami Piraj works at the Ministry of Culture in Kosvoa and the vice presidents of the scene and art music.

Tomor Berisha
Tomor Berisha (born 1948) is without doubt one of the most successful composers in genres such as folk spirit, pop melodies and entertainment music and arrangement

He was born in Pristina. During elementary school studies, he took private music lessons.
After music school, he studied further at the Music Academy in Belgrade in the theoretical-pedagogy. After his studies he worked for several years as a redactor and producer at Pristina's television section for popular music. At the same time he worked as a composer, arranger, kapellmeister and pianist. His works as a composer consists of children's songs, folk songs, pop songs and popular music is of great magnitude. He has processed several folk songs for RTV Pristina and he also worked for Zagreb's famous String Quartet Stratik. Han has published two collections of famous Albanian folk songs, pop melodies and music.
Additionally, he composed several solo songs for tenor, chorus and orchestra. He has participated in most music festivals and competitions in and Kosovo and got a high number of prizes and awards.
The most significant prize he received was the Audience Award in the music festival "Akordet e Kosoves" of 1971 with the song |Fluturo nga kafazi" with lyrics by Jusuf Gervalla and The Interpretation of Gani Miftari. As of today he works at the music high school in Pristina and is a member in Kosovo's Composers association. He participated in a large number of festival in most of which he was awarded.
He has also published two books:
"Kenge dhe Melodi Instrumentale (Valle) te zgjedhura shqipe ne frymen e melosit popullor" (Songs And Instrumental Melodies in the spirit of the Albanian Melos)
"Melodi te lehta shqipe te paharruara dhe pjese te popullarizuara te muzikes serioze" (Unforgettable melodies of popular Classical music)

Work
Tomor Berisha has released a best of CD of his work where the songs included are:

Festival of Opatija

Kosova Kamerfest
Kosova Kamerfest is the International Festival of Chamber Music, it was founded in 2000 with the indicative of the Music Artist Association of Kosovo (Shoqata e Artisteve Muzikor te Kosoves). It is considered one of the elite festivals in Kosovo and it held every year in Pristina. This festival is known for the participation of international masters of worldwide Chamber Music.

Pristina Jazz Festival
Prishina Jazz Festival (2005–present) is the festival of Jazz Music in Pristina who presents international artists, associations and festivals. Through the years it has welcomed world class artists who gave their one of a kind performances and left their mark in the festival, and through this they also promoted the festival worldwide. Since jazz requires artistic exchange and collaboration the festival leads to overcoming the obstacles and isolation that artists and their communities face. Two projects are currently in development that will involve 35 musicians from Macedonia, Turkey, Bulgaria, Slovenia, Serbia, Albania, Greece and Kosovo.
The motto is - "Together is better!". Location for the recent editions has been "Teatri Oda" (Oda Theatre)

Dates through the Years

For a more detailed list of performers and dates see The Albanian Article for Pristina Jazz Festival on Wikipedia

ReMusica Festival

ReMusica Festival (born 2002) is the International Festival of New Music and was founded by a few major Kosovan composers. The goal of this Festival is that, through the introduction of the change of stylistic tendencies that appeared in the Music of the beginnings of the 20th Century to those of today. Another important goal of The Festival is the introducement of the Most Known names in European and Worldwide Music to the Kosovan audience. The festival was organised by "Qendra Per Muziken e Re"(The Centre for New Music), which is a member of ECP-NM.

The festival is directed by Rafet Rudi and the two main goals of the festival are: The two main goals of the Festival are: the promotion of contemporary music of the 20th century up to the present day and creating relationships between Kosovan and worldwide music creators and their colleagues from around the world.

Grand Prix D'Eurovision

Another important Festival which was not traditionally held in Pristina or Kosovo is "Grand Prix D'Eurovision" which was held from 1961 to 1984 and was followed by the Eurovision Song Contest. The festival was held in different places in the former Yugoslavia such as Serbia, Macedonia etc. A notable edition for Pristina was 1986 when this festival was held for the first time in Pristina, Kosovo.

Among the most successful Kosovan composers and songs who participated in this festival were:

See also
:Category:Kosovan composers
List of Kosovo Albanians
Music of Kosovo

External links

References

Culture in Pristina
 Kosovo composers